Union Island is a small island in the San Joaquin River delta, in California. It is part of San Joaquin County, and managed by Reclamation Districts 1 and 2.

References

Islands of San Joaquin County, California
Islands of the Sacramento–San Joaquin River Delta
Islands of Northern California